Katrina Conder is an Australian television presenter. She was a host Channel Nine's late night game show Quizmania. She made her Quizmania debut on 6 January 2007. Katrina has also appeared on 3 episodes of Blue Heelers as a nurse. Katrina starred in a lead role in the 2005/06 9minds production of Black Rock

Conder has also appeared on Channel 9's 1 vs 100.

She is a graduate of the National Theatre Drama School in Melbourne. Katrina Conder trained as a dancer at the Hart School of Dance in Melbourne. Her training included: Tap, Jazz, Ballet, Song & Dance.

Katrina presented on Channel 9's replacement of Quizmania, The Mint, until it was axed on 29 March 2008.

References

Australian game show hosts
Living people
Year of birth missing (living people)